The Church of St Mary, in the village of Collaton St Mary in Devon, was built between 1864 and 1866 in memory of Mary Maxwell Hogg, teenaged daughter of the Rev  John Roughton Hogg, owner of the nearby Blagdon Barton estate, and granddaughter of hymnwriter and vicar Henry Francis Lyte.  It is a Grade II* listed building.

References

External links
 http://www.ocotilloroad.com/geneal/hogg1.html#MARY1

Church of England church buildings in Devon
Grade II* listed churches in Devon
Churches completed in 1866
19th-century Church of England church buildings
1866 establishments in England